Statistics of Ekstraklasa for the 1934 season.

Overview
It was contested by 12 teams, and Ruch Chorzów won the championship.

League table

Results

References
Poland - List of final tables (RSSSF)

Ekstraklasa seasons
1
Pol
Pol